Naan Pudicha Mappillai is a 1991 Indian Tamil-language comedy drama film written and directed by V. Sekhar. The film stars Nizhalgal Ravi, Saranya Ponvannan and Aishwarya, with Janagaraj, Sumithra, Goundamani, Senthil, Vasu Vikram and Shanmugasundari in supporting roles. It was released on 21 February 1991. The film was remade in Telugu as Mamagaru, in Kannada as Muddina Maava and in Hindi as Meherbaan.

Plot

Cast 
 Nizhalgal Ravi as Village President Muthuraj
 Saranya Ponvannan as Lakshmi
 Aishwarya as Rajathi
 Janagaraj as Pichayandi
 Sumithra as Rajathi's mother
 Goundamani as Thandavarayan
 Senthil as Konaiyan
 Vasu Vikram as Thandavarayan's son
 Shanmugasundari as Rajathi's grandmother

Soundtrack 
Lyrics were written by Vaali, Pulamaipithan, Muthulingam and composed by Chandrabose.

Reception 
Sundarji of Kalki wrote .

References

External links 
 

1990s Tamil-language films
1991 comedy-drama films
1991 films
Films directed by V. Sekhar
Films scored by Chandrabose (composer)
Indian comedy-drama films
Tamil films remade in other languages